John Alexander Heath (born 1 June 1978) is an English former first-class cricketer.

Heath was born at Grimsby and was educated at Sir John Nelthorpe School, before going up to Pembroke College, Cambridge to study East German literature. While at Cambridge he made his debut in first-class cricket for Cambridge UCCE against Surrey in 2002 at Fenner's. He later played two first-class matches for Cambridge University, the first later in 2002 against Oxford University, and the second against the same opposition in 2003. He scored 43 runs across his two matches for Cambridge University, while with his right-arm medium pace bowling he took 2 wickets. He gained a cricket blue and graduated with a PhD.

Heath played minor counties cricket for Lincolnshire in 2002, making a single appearance at Grantham against Hertfordshire in the Minor Counties Championship. His brother, Duncan, also played first-class cricket.

Notes and references

External links

1978 births
Living people
Cricketers from Grimsby
Alumni of Pembroke College, Cambridge
English cricketers
Cambridge MCCU cricketers
Cambridge University cricketers
Lincolnshire cricketers